Helspoort Pass, Is situated in the Eastern Cape, province of South Africa, on the regional road R350, between Grahamstown and Bedford, Eastern Cape.

References

Mountain passes of the Eastern Cape